Kelekli, formerly Şara, is a village in the Nizip District, Gaziantep Province, Turkey. The village had a population of 792 in 2022 and is inhabited by Turkmens of the Barak tribe.

References

Villages in Karkamış District